The Barrandeocerina comprise a suborder of Early Paleozoic nautiloid cephalopods, primitively coiled but later forms may be cyrtoconic, gyroconic, torticonic, and even breviconic, all having empty siphuncles with thin connecting rings. The Barrandeocerina were originally defined as a separate order by Rousseau Flower (Flower and Kummel, 1950), but since then have been united within the Tarphycerida as a suborder (Teichert 1988). Derivation is from the Tarphyceratidae.

In early forms the siphuncle is central or subcentral, orthochoanitic (septal necks short and straight), and thin, with tubular segments.  Later forms include those with cyrtochoanitic septal necks (curved outward) and segments that may be slightly to strongly expanded into the chambers.

Taxonomy
Six families are included in the Barrandeocerina, (ex Barrandeocerida).

Barrandeoceratidae M Ord-M Dev
Plectoceratidae M-U Ord
Apsidoceratidae  M-U Ord
Uranoceratidae  U Ord-M Sil
Lechritrochoceratidae M-U Sil
Nephriticeratidae  L-M Dev

Flower also included the Lituitidae in the Barrandeocerida, (Flower and Kummel 1950), which were found (Sweet 1964) to have more in common with the  Tarphycerida in the original Treatise Part K.

References

Rousseau H Flower and Bernhard Kummel Jr 1950. A Classification of the Nautiloidea. Journal of Paleontology Vol 24, no.5 pp604–616, Sept 1950
Walter C Sweet, 1964, Nautiloidea - Barrandeocerida. Treatise on Invertebrate Paleontology Part K Mollusca 3. Geological Society of America and University of Kansas Press
Curt Teichert, 1988. Main Feature of Cephalopod Evolution. The Mollusca Vol.12 Paleontology and Neontology of Cephalopods.  Academic Press

Prehistoric nautiloids
Mollusc suborders
Prehistoric animal suborders
Taxa named by Rousseau H. Flower